The 1943 Camp Grant Warriors football team represented Camp Grant during the 1943 college football season.  The Warriors were coached by Charlie Bachman of Michigan State, and compiled a record of 2–6–2 against an incredibly hard schedule that included final #2 Iowa Pre-Flight, #3 Michigan, #5 Purdue, and #6 Great Lakes Navy.  They were ranked a single time by the AP, achieving the #20 spot with a 2–3–1 record, and were dropped the next week after a loss to the #13 ranked Minnesota Golden Gophers.

Schedule

References

 
Camp Grant
Camp Grant Warriors football seasons
Camp Grant Warriors football